Scomo, SCOMO or ScoMo may refer to:

 Software Component Management Object, used for accessing and managing software components
 Scott Morrison (born 1968), 30th Prime Minister of Australia, nicknamed Scomo or SCUMmo
 Scott Morrison (basketball player) (born 1986), Canadian basketball player, nicknamed Scomo
 George Scott-Moncrieff (1910–1974), Scottish writer, nicknamed Scomo
 Lucy Scott-Moncrieff (born 1954), British judge and solicitor, nicknamed ScoMo

See also

 Scott Morrison (disambiguation)
 Scott Moncrieff (disambiguation)